The 2010–11 Deutsche Eishockey Liga season is the 17th season since the founding of the Deutsche Eishockey Liga. As reigning champions of the 2. Bundesliga, EHC München were promoted to the DEL.

Prior to the season, the league was plagued by financial uncertainty and as a result the two Hesse teams, the Kassel Huskies and Frankfurt Lions, lost their licenses through insolvency.

Teams

Regular season

GP = Games Played, W = Wins, OTW = Overtime win, SOW = Shootout win, OTL = Overtime loss, SOL = Shootout loss, L = Loss
Color code:  = Direct Playoff qualification,  = Playoff qualification round,  = No playoff

Playoffs

Playoff qualifications
The playoff qualifications were played between March 16 and 18, 2011 in the Best-of-three mode.

OT = Overtime

Playoff brackets

Quarterfinals
The quarterfinals were played in the Best-of-five mode starting March 23 until March 31.

Semifinals
The semifinals were played in the Best-of-five mode, from April 3 to April 12, 2011.

Finals
The finals were played in the Best-of-five mode, from April 14 to April 19, 2011.

The Eisbären Berlin won the title for the 5th time.

References

External links
Official League Website

1
Ger
2010-11